Lunca Cernii de Jos is a commune in Hunedoara County, Transylvania, Romania. It is composed of eight villages: Ciumița (Csumicapuszta), Fântâna (Vádtelep), Gura Bordului, Lunca Cernii de Jos, Lunca Cernii de Sus (Felsőnyiresfalva), Meria (Kékesfalva), Negoiu (Nyegojlunka) and Valea Babii.

Geography

The commune is located in the southwestern part of the county. The nearest city is Hunedoara, 46 km distant. It is situated among the foothills of the Poiana Ruscă Mountains. The average altitude is 850 m, and the terrain is hilly. The commune borders two other counties, Caraș-Severin and Timiș.

Villages

The name of the commune derives from lunca (“valley”) of the Cerna River. Lunca Cernii de Jos and Lunca Cernii de Sus lie for 11 km along the river valley; the local peasantry works in animal husbandry and logging. Meria is located on a mountainside at over 1000 m altitude, separated from other villages by high peaks, deep valleys and dense forest. Negoiu is situated in the Negoiului and Sterminosului valleys.

References

Communes in Hunedoara County
Localities in Transylvania